1924 in sports describes the year's events in world sport.

American football
 NFL championship – Cleveland Bulldogs (7–1–1)

Association football
England
 The Football League – Huddersfield Town 57 points, Cardiff City 57, Sunderland 53, Bolton Wanderers 50, Sheffield United 50, Aston Villa 49
 FA Cup final – Newcastle United 2–0 Aston Villa at Empire Stadium, Wembley, London
Germany
 National Championship – 1. FC Nürnberg 2–0 Hamburger SV at Berlin
Greece
 AEK Athens officially founded on April 13.
Monaco
 AS Monaco officially founded on August 23.
Peru
 Club Universitario de Deportes was founded in Javier Prado Avenue area, Lima on August 7.

Athletics
Men's 1500 metres
 Paavo Nurmi (Finland) breaks the world record by running a time of 3:52.6 at Helsinki.

England
 1924 Women's Olympiad, Stamford Bridge, London

Australian rules football
VFL Premiership
 Essendon wins the 28th VFL Premiership: under the finals system used, no Grand Final is played.
Brownlow Medal
 The inaugural Brownlow Medal is awarded to Edward Greeves of Geelong.

Bandy
Sweden
 Championship final – Västerås SK 4–1 IF Linnéa

Baseball
World Series
 4–10 October — Washington Senators (AL) defeats New York Giants (NL) to win the 1924 World Series by 4 games to 3
Negro leagues
 Kansas City Monarchs (NNL) defeats Hilldale (ECL) 5 games to 4 with 1 tie in the first official Negro World Series.
 Pitcher Nip Winters wins a record 27 games for Hilldale in the ECL regular season.

Biathlon
1924 Winter Olympics
 Military patrol, the forerunner of biathlon which combines cross-country skiing and rifle shooting, is staged as a demonstration event at the inaugural Winter Olympics in Chamonix.  The winning team is Switzerland.

Bobsleigh
1924 Winter Olympics
 Bobsleigh debuts as an Olympic sport at Chamonix at the inaugural Winter Olympics.  The sole event is the 4-man bob which is won by Switzerland I (gold) ahead of Great Britain II (silver) and Belgium I (bronze).

Boxing
Events
 10 August — the World Featherweight Championship title becomes vacant as Johnny Dundee relinquishes it to fight as a lightweight
Lineal world champions
 World Heavyweight Championship – Jack Dempsey
 World Light Heavyweight Championship – Mike McTigue
 World Middleweight Championship – Harry Greb
 World Welterweight Championship – Mickey Walker
 World Lightweight Championship – Benny Leonard
 World Featherweight Championship – Johnny Dundee → vacant
 World Bantamweight Championship – Joe Lynch → Abe Goldstein → Eddie "Cannonball" Martin
 World Flyweight Championship – Pancho Villa

Canadian football
Grey Cup
 12th Grey Cup in the Canadian Football League – Queen's University 11–2 Toronto Balmy Beach

Cricket
Events
 England defeats South Africa 3–0 with two matches drawn. There is a sensational start to the series when the South Africans are bowled out for only 30, in just 12.3 overs, in their first innings of the First Test at Edgbaston, England having made over 400.
England
 County Championship – Yorkshire
 Minor Counties Championship – Berkshire
 Most runs – Frank Woolley 2344 @ 49.87 (HS 202)
 Most wickets – Maurice Tate 205 @ 13.74 (BB 8–18)
 Wisden Cricketers of the Year – Bob Catterall, Jack MacBryan, Herbie Taylor, Dick Tyldesley, Dodger Whysall
Australia
 Sheffield Shield – Victoria
 Most runs – Bill Ponsford 777 @ 111.00 (HS 248)
 Most wickets – Albert Hartkopf and Norman Williams 26 apiece
India
 Bombay Quadrangular – Hindus
New Zealand
 Plunket Shield – Wellington
South Africa
 Currie Cup – not contested
West Indies
 Inter-Colonial Tournament – Barbados

Curling
1924 Winter Olympics
 Curling is played at the inaugural Winter Olympics. It is a demonstration sport at the time but is retrospectively granted official status.  The gold medal is won by the Great Britain and Ireland team.

Cycling
Tour de France
 Ottavio Bottecchia (Italy) wins the 18th Tour de France

Field hockey
Events
 7 January — the International Hockey Federation (FIH) is founded in Paris by seven member countries: Austria, Belgium, Czechoslovakia, France, Hungary, Spain and Switzerland.

Figure skating
Events
 Figure skating is included in the inaugural Winter Olympics, having already featured in the 1908 and 1920 Summer Olympics.  The Olympic gold medallists and the world championship winners are the same in all three events.
1924 Winter Olympics
 Men's individual – Gillis Grafström (Sweden)
 Women's individual – Herma Szabo (Austria)
 Pairs – Helene Engelmann and Alfred Berger (Austria)
World Figure Skating Championships
 World Men's Champion – Gillis Grafström (Sweden)
 World Women's Champion – Herma Szabo (Austria)
 World Pairs Champions – Helene Engelmann and Alfred Berger (Austria)

Golf
Major tournaments
 British Open – Walter Hagen
 US Open – Cyril Walker
 USPGA Championship – Walter Hagen
Other tournaments
 British Amateur – Ernest Holderness
 US Amateur – Bobby Jones

Horse racing
Events
 The inaugural running of the Cheltenham Gold Cup is won by Red Splash
England
 Cheltenham Gold Cup – Red Splash
 Grand National – Master Robert
 1,000 Guineas Stakes – Plack
 2,000 Guineas Stakes – Diophon
 The Derby – Sansovino
 The Oaks – Straitlace
 St. Leger Stakes – Salmon-Trout
Australia
 Melbourne Cup – Backwood
Canada
 King's Plate – Maternal Pride
France
 Prix de l'Arc de Triomphe – Massine
Ireland
 Irish Grand National – Kilbarry
 Irish Derby Stakes – Haine dead heated with Zodiac 
USA
 Kentucky Derby – Black Gold 
 Preakness Stakes – Nellie Morse
 Belmont Stakes – Mad Play

Ice hockey
Events
 Ice hockey is included in the inaugural Winter Olympics, having already featured in the 1920 Summer Olympics.  Canada successfully defends the Olympic title.
1924 Winter Olympics
 Gold Medal – Canada
 Silver Medal – USA
 Bronze Medal – Great Britain
Stanley Cup
 22–25 March — Montreal Canadiens defeats Calgary Tigers by 2 games to 0 in the 1924 Stanley Cup Finals
Events
 Sault Ste. Marie Greyhounds defeats the Winnipeg Selkirks 6–3 to win the Allan Cup
 1 December — the expansion Boston Bruins and Montreal Maroons of the NHL play their inaugural game against each other at Boston.  Boston wins this game 2–1 but then lose eleven in a row.

Motorsport

Nordic skiing
Events
 Nordic skiing stages its first international competitions at the inaugural Winter Olympics in Chamonix.  Four events are held (for men only): cross-country skiing over 18 km and 50 km; ski jumping on the large hill; and Nordic combined as an individual event.
1924 Winter Olympics
 Cross-country skiing (18 km) – gold medal: Thorleif Haug (Norway)
 Cross-country skiing (50 km) – gold medal: Thorleif Haug (Norway)
 Ski jumping – gold medal: Jacob Tullin Thams (Norway)
 Nordic combined – gold medal: Thorleif Haug (Norway)

Olympic Games
1924 Winter Olympics
 The 1924 Winter Olympics, the inaugural Winter Olympics, takes place in Chamonix, France.  It is originally called Semaine des Sports d'Hiver, or "International Winter Sports Week".
 Norway wins the most medals (18) and the most gold medals (5)
1924 Summer Olympics
 The 1924 Summer Olympics takes place in Paris
 United States wins the most medals (99) and the most gold medals (45)

Rowing
The Boat Race
 5 April — Cambridge wins the 76th Oxford and Cambridge Boat Race

Rugby league
England
 Championship – Batley
 Challenge Cup final – Wigan 21–4 Oldham at Athletic Grounds, Rochdale 
 Lancashire League Championship – Wigan
 Yorkshire League Championship – Batley
 Lancashire County Cup – St Helens Recs 17–0 Swinton 
 Yorkshire County Cup – Hull F.C. 10–4 Huddersfield
Australia
 NSW Premiership – Balmain 3–0 South Sydney (grand final)

Rugby union
Five Nations Championship
 37th Five Nations Championship series is won by England who complete the Grand Slam

Speed skating
Events
 Speed skating debuts as an Olympic sport in Chamonix at the inaugural Winter Olympics.  Five men only events are held.
Speed Skating World Championships
 Men's All-round Champion – Roald Larsen (Norway)
1924 Winter Olympics
 500m – gold medal: Charles Jewtraw (USA)
 1500m – gold medal: Clas Thunberg (Finland)
 5000m – gold medal: Clas Thunberg (Finland)
 10000m – gold medal: Julius Skutnabb (Finland)
 All-round – gold medal: Clas Thunberg (Finland)

Swimming
 Johnny Weissmuller sets 100-yard freestyle world record (57.4 seconds) in Miami FL

Tennis
Australia
 Australian Men's Singles Championship – James Anderson (Australia) defeats Richard Schlesinger (Australia) 6–3 6–4 3–6 5–7 6–3
 Australian Women's Singles Championship – Sylvia Lance Harper (Australia) defeats Esna Boyd Robertson (Australia) 6–3 3–6 8–6
England
 Wimbledon Men's Singles Championship – Jean Borotra (France) defeats René Lacoste (France) 6–1 3–6 6–1 3–6 6–4
 Wimbledon Women's Singles Championship – Kitty McKane Godfree (Great Britain) defeats Helen Wills Moody (USA) 4–6 6–4 6–4
France
 French Men's Singles Championship – Jean Borotra (France) defeats René Lacoste (France) 7–5 6–4 0–6 5–7 6–2
 French Women's Singles Championship – Emilienne Didi Vlasto (France) defeats Jeanne Vaussard (France) 6–2 6–3
USA
 American Men's Singles Championship – Bill Tilden (USA) defeats Bill Johnston (USA) 6–1 9–7 6–2
 American Women's Singles Championship – Helen Wills Moody (USA) defeats Molla Bjurstedt Mallory (Norway) 6–1 6–3
Davis Cup
 1924 International Lawn Tennis Challenge –  5–0  at Germantown Cricket Club (grass) Philadelphia, United States

References

 
Sports by year